"I'm Ready" is a song by American indie pop band AJR. It was released as a single on August 22, 2013, through AJR Productions and Warner Bros. Records. The song samples SpongeBob SquarePants shouting his catchphrase, "I'm ready!" The song is included on their debut extended play (EP), I'm Ready (2013), and their debut album, Living Room (2015).

The song charted best internationally in Australia, where it peaked at number five and was certified multi-platinum. It reached number 65 on the Billboard Hot 100 in 2014, and was certified platinum in 2015.

Music and production
The song employs a notable sample of SpongeBob SquarePants saying "I'm ready!" from the eponymous animated television series' debut episode "Help Wanted". AJR explained that the inspiration for the song came when the band members were "talking one day and joked that David Guetta or Skrillex would sample SpongeBob kinda in like, an ironic way. Then Ryan said 'let's not give it away to them, why don't we do it!'"

Music video
The video depicts AJR playing the song in a rented out space to a crowd of three people. One of them begins filming on her phone and soon their small performance is picked up by everyone online who proceed to storm the outside of the space to hear them live. Videos online depict people dancing, lip-synching and numerous other tributes to their song as their video begins to rack up views. Sia's initial tweet of the band can briefly be seen. The whole scenario is revealed to be the actual video with only three views, presumably from the members themselves. Ryan asks it they think they will go viral to which Jack bluntly responds "Nope". "I'm Ready" and "Infinity" are the only two videos where Adam and Jack do not possess their recognizable visual gimmicks. They are both clean shaven and Jack lacks his signature bomber hat.

Usage in media
The song played in the trailer and TV spot for the 2015 film Trainwreck, which stars actress/comedian Amy Schumer and actor Bill Hader, as well as celebrity athletes John Cena and LeBron James.

"I'm Ready" is also often associated with YouTuber and Sidemen member Tobit "Tobi" Brown (known online as TBJZL or Tobjizzle) who has used the chorus of the song in his introduction to his YouTube videos since 2013. On October 14, 2019, Brown announced that he can no longer use the song in his intro after Warner Music Group (AJR's record label) started copyright claiming his YouTube videos, despite being whitelisted by the band and having their permission to use the song.

Track listing

Charts

Weekly charts

Year-end charts

Certifications

Release history

References

2013 songs
2013 singles
AJR (band) songs
Warner Records singles
SpongeBob SquarePants